Cecil Fairfax Goodricke (1883–1944) was a sailor from South Africa, who represented his country at the 1932 Summer Olympics in the Snowbird as well as in the Star in Los Angeles, US.

Sources
 

1883 births
1944 deaths
Sportspeople from Durban
Colony of Natal people
South African male sailors (sport)
Sailors at the 1932 Summer Olympics – Snowbird
Sailors at the 1932 Summer Olympics – Star
Olympic sailors of South Africa